Shishtavec is a former municipality in Kukës County, Albania. At the 2015 local government reform it became a subdivision of the municipality Kukës. The population at the 2011 census was 3,835.

The municipal unit consists of the following villages:
 Shishtavec
 Novosej
 Kollovoz
 Shtrezë
 Borje
 Oreshkë
 Cërnalevë

References

Former municipalities in Kukës County
Administrative units of Kukës